Peinlich (Scottish Gaelic: Peinlea) is a hamlet on the Isle of Skye in Scotland. Its main claim to fame is that its name is German for "embarrassing".

See List of United Kingdom locations: Pe-Pen.

External links

Peinlich on "Scotland's Places"

Populated places in the Isle of Skye